Pike Rovers F.C. is an Irish association football club based in Southill, Limerick. The club plays at Crossagalla and their senior men's team competes in the Limerick & District League. They have previously played in the Munster Senior League. During their history Pike Rovers have also entered teams in the FAI Cup, the FAI Intermediate Cup, the FAI Junior Cup and the FAI Youth Cup. They have been finalists in the latter three cup competitions.

History
Pike Rovers F.C. was founded in 1938 in the Mulgrave Street/Blackboy Pike district  of Limerick. The club colours are a variation of green and white hooped shirts, green or white shorts and green/white socks and were initially inspired by the colours of Celtic F.C. In 1949–50 they became the first association football club from County Limerick to win a national trophy when they won the FAI Youth Cup.

Notable former players

Republic of Ireland internationals
  Tim Cuneen
  Joe Waters
  Shadrach Ogie
  Ray Lowe

Honours
Munster Senior League
Winners: 1951–52: 1 
Runners-up: 1952–53: 1
FAI Intermediate Cup
Runners-up: 1950-51: 1
FAI Junior Cup
Winners: 2010–11 : 1
Runners-up: 1947–48, 2015–16: 2
FAI Youth Cup
Winners: 1949–50 : 1
Runners-up: 1955-56: 1

References

External links
   Pike Rovers @ Junior Soccer Portal

Association football clubs in Limerick (city)
Association football clubs in County Limerick
Former Munster Senior League (association football) clubs
1938 establishments in Ireland
Association football clubs established in 1938